Elizabeth Royte is an American science/nature writer.  She is best known for her books Garbage Land (a New York Times Notable Book of the Year 2005), The Tapir's Morning Bath: Solving the Mysteries of the Tropical Rain Forest (a  New York Times Notable Book of the Year, 2001), Bottlemania: How Water Went on Sale and Why We Bought It (a "Best of" or "Top 10" book of 2008 in Entertainment Weekly, Seed and Plenty magazines) and A Place to Go 

Royte's articles have appeared in The New York Times Magazine, Harper's, National Geographic, The New York Times Book Review, The New Yorker, The Nation, Outside, Smithsonian, and other magazines. Her work has been featured in the Best American Science Writing 2004 and the "Best American Science Writing 2009." Royte is a former Alicia Patterson Foundation fellow and a recipient of Bard College's John Dewey Award for Distinguished Public Service.

Her article about women who survived the genocide in Rwanda attracted a good deal of attention. She has traveled throughout the world to research her articles and books.

Royte won an Alicia Patterson Journalism Fellowship in 1990 to research and write about life at a biological research station in the tropics.

Royte began her career as an intern at The Nation. She did freelance copy editing and writing for other magazines.

Royte lives in Park Slope, Brooklyn with her husband and their daughter.  Her brother is an ecologist. Her uncle is theater director/producer Robert Kalfin.

Selected works

Books
 (2001)  The Tapir's Morning Bath: Mysteries of the Tropical Rain Forest and the Scientists Who Are Trying to Solve Them;  Boston :Houghton Mifflin
 (2005) Garbage Land;  New York :Little, Brown
 (2008) Bottlemania: How Water Went on Sale and Why We Bought It;  New York :Bloomsbury

Essays and reporting

References

Author biography
Author interview following the release of "Garbage Land"
Discussion of "Garbage Land" on PBS
New York Times review of Bottlemania
Q&A on Royte's method of research and advocacy
Interview in Pulse Berlin
Elizabeth Royte home page

Year of birth missing (living people)
Living people
21st-century American non-fiction writers
21st-century American women writers
National Geographic people
People from Park Slope
Women science writers
American nature writers